The 1981 San Marino Grand Prix was a Formula One motor race held at Imola on 3 May 1981. It was the fourth race of the 1981 Formula One World Championship. 

The race was the first to bear the title "San Marino Grand Prix", although the Imola circuit is in Italy and several non-championship Formula One races and the 1980 Italian Grand Prix had previously been held at the circuit. The Acque-Minerali chicane had been widened from the year before and was faster; the chicane in its original narrow configuration in 1980 was unpopular with drivers because it was very slow.

The Lotus team withdrew their entries because the FIA upheld the ban on the Lotus 88 and team owner Colin Chapman felt the 81s were no longer competitive.

Gilles Villeneuve took the early lead until an ill-fated pit stop for slick tyres, whereafter Didier Pironi held the lead until late in the race and was passed by Nelson Piquet, who eventually won the race. As well as being Michele Alboreto's Grand Prix debut, the race is also notable for the recovery of Gilles Villeneuve to seventh place, after misjudgement of tyre selection for the conditions.  While the team did not qualify for the race, it was the first race entered by Toleman, which is now Alpine F1 Team.

Classification

Qualifying

Race

Championship standings after the race

Drivers' Championship standings

Constructors' Championship standings

Note: Only the top five positions are included for both sets of standings.

References

San Marino Grand Prix
San Marino Grand Prix
San Marino